Edouard Jules Joseph Huberti (6 January 1818, Brussels - 12 June 1880, Schaerbeek) was a Belgian landscape painter and watercolorist.

Biography 
He studied architecture at the Royal Academy of Fine Arts in Antwerp, but he was also a gifted singer and violinist. For a time, he worked as a music teacher and wrote some  operettas. He taught himself how to paint, produced his first simple oils on cardboard in 1837, and had a small exhibit in Brussels in 1857, but it was 1860 before he began working as a full-time artist, having been attracted to the profession by the growing public acceptance of realistic landscapes, painted en plein aire.

To improve his skills, he worked with Théodore Fourmois, who took him to paint in the woods around Tervuren.

Unlike most of his peers, he preferred to paint wide open, sometimes monotonous plains, with clouds and perhaps one lonely tree. His favorite spots were in the Kempen (including Genk, the site of another artists' colony), the polders on the Scheldt, in Hainaut, and in the Meuse valley, near Anseremme, where he became involved with yet another artists' colony.

His first exhibit outside Belgium was in 1862 at the Great London Exposition.

In 1868, he became one of the founding members of the Société Libre des Beaux-Arts, and was also a member of the Société Royale Belge des Aquarellistes. He travelled to France in 1874, to make contact with members of the Barbizon School and, in 1876, was invited to become a member of the Hollandsche Teekenmaatschappij, the Dutch equivalent of the Société Royale.

Despite these involvements, he was rather introspective by nature and took no part in the controversies that arose. His personal life was largely one spent in seclusion with his family. His works received reviews that were favorable, but not enthusiastic. Toward the end of his life, he became melancholy and depressed and began painting flowers.

His son, Gustave, inherited his musical abilities; becoming a well-known musician and composer of vocal works.

Sources 
 Saskia De Bodt: “Edouard Huberti", in The Dictionary of Art, Vol.11; Jane Turner (Ed.), Macmillan Publishers Ltd, 
 Bénézit, "Dictionary of Artists", Ed. Gründ, Paris, 2006 
 J. du Jardin, “L’Art flamand” IV, pp. 137–144; Brussels, 1896-1900
 S. Pierron, “Edouard Huberti”, A. Flam. & Holl., 1913
 M.E Belpaire, “Edouard Huberti 1818-1880”, Kst. & Levensbeeld, pp. 77–106, 1919
 R. Hoozee and M. Tahon-Vanroose, “Het landschap in de Belgische Kunst, 1830-1914”, exhibition catalog, pp. 104–109, MSK Ghent, 1980

External links

1818 births
1880 deaths
Belgian painters
Belgian landscape painters
Belgian watercolourists
Royal Academy of Fine Arts (Antwerp) alumni
Artists from Brussels